Carbia brunnefacta is a moth in the family Geometridae. It is found on Borneo and possibly in Singapore. The habitat consists of lowland areas.

The length of the forewings is 9–10 mm.

References

Moths described in 1997
Eupitheciini
Moths of Asia